SS Colby Victory was the 84th Victory ship built during World War II under the Emergency Shipbuilding program. She was launched by the California Shipbuilding Company on January 27, 1945, and completed on March 12, 1945. The ship’s United States Maritime Commission designation was VC2- S- AP3, hull number V50, built in 83 days. SS Colby Victory served in the Pacific Ocean during World War II. The 10,500-ton Victory ships were designed to replace the earlier Liberty ships. Liberty ships were designed to be used just for World War II. Victory ships were designed to last longer and serve after the war. The Victory ship differed from a Liberty ship in that they were: faster, longer and wider, taller, a thinner stack set farther toward the superstructure and had a long raised forecastle. 

In the fall of 1946 Colby Victory arrived in New York Harbor from Bremerhaven, Germany with troops. Colby Victory and 96 other Victory ships were converted to troop ships to bring the US soldiers home as part of Operation Magic Carpet.

Post war 
Colby Victory was sold in 1947 to the Dutch government and transferred to Holland America Line and renamed the SS Axeldijk. SS Axeldijk steamed from Rotterdam to Cuba and Mexico, and then to New Orleans. In 1950 and 1951 she steam on the Red Star Line. In 1952 she was operated back on the Holland America Line till 1959. Holland America Line renamed her the SS Axeldyk in 1954. She was sold in 1963 to International Union Marine Corp of Monrovia, Liberia and renamed the SS Monique. In 1965 the vessel was sold to Pacific Coast Shipping Company of Monrovia and kept the name SS Monique. In 1971 she was scrapped in Taiwan.

See also
List of Victory ships
 Liberty ship
 Type C1 ship
 Type C2 ship
 Type C3 ship

References

Sources
Sawyer, L.A. and W.H. Mitchell. Victory ships and tankers: The history of the ‘Victory’ type cargo ships and of the tankers built in the United States of America during World War II, Cornell Maritime Press, 1974, 0-87033-182-5.
United States Maritime Commission: 
Victory Cargo Ships 

Victory ships
Ships built in Los Angeles
United States Merchant Marine
1945 ships
Troop ships of the United States
World War II merchant ships of the United States
Cargo liners